In Greek mythology Nestor's Cup is a legendary golden mixing cup which was owned by the hero Nestor.  The cup is described in the Iliad, and possibly appeared elsewhere in the Epic Cycle.  Despite its brief appearance in the Iliad, the cup was the subject of significant attention from ancient commentators on Homer.

Epic Cycle
Nestor's Cup is described in Book 11 of the Iliad.  Machaon, son of Asclepius, is injured by Paris, and taken back to the Greek camp by Nestor; a healing drink is prepared for him in the cup.  The cup is described over six lines.

Along with its description in the Iliad, the cup of Nestor may have appeared elsewhere in the Epic Cycle.  Stephanie West argues that there was a pre-existing body of poetry which dealt with Nestor's heroic exploits in his youth, and which told of Nestor's cup.  Peter Allan Hansen suggests that the cup may have appeared in the Cypria, perhaps in the episode known from a citation in Athenaeus where Nestor gives Menelaus counsel after the abduction of Helen.

Reception
Despite its relatively brief description in the Iliad – a mere six lines, compared to some 130 describing the Shield of Achilles in Book 18 – the cup was the subject of a great deal of attention in antiquity.

Ancient critics writing on the Iliad were particularly interested in three aspects of Nestor's Cup: its size, why it was that only Nestor could lift it, and the doves on its handles.  At least as early as the fifth century BC, scholars including Glaucon, Antisthenes, and Stesimbrotos addressed the question of why Nestor was the only one who could lift his cup; the problem continued to be addressed throughout antiquity at least up until the time of Porphyry, who included it in his Homeric Questions.  The doves were discussed by Asclepiades of Myrlea, and caught the imagination of Martial, who mentions them in his description of Nestor's cup in poem 8.6.

References

Works cited
 
 
 

Iliad
Nestor (mythology)
Drinkware
Mythological objects